The Kristianstad University is a university college (högskola) in Kristianstad, Sweden.

Established in 1977, Kristianstad University is one of the newest Swedish institutions of higher education. However, higher education in the region is much older. Teacher education can be traced back to 1835. A training course for nursing was started in 1893. Technical education was established in 1912.

Despite the young age of the institution of Business Administration the BSc programme in business administration is ranked top 3 in the country by the Swedish Council of Higher Education since 2012 (ranked 1st 2012 and 2017). A master thesis done in Stockholm School of Economics ranks Kristianstad's programme as #2 behind the first mentioned.

In 1995, Kristianstad University moved into the present main campus. The college has 12 000 students in various fields of study.,  Programmes and courses are offered in teaching, behavioural, social, natural and health sciences, business administration and engineering.

Kristianstad University is an associate member of the European University Association. It also participates in the Erasmus Programme.

Academic Departments

Faculty of Health Science
Education and research is conducted at the Faculty of health science within four departments: 
Department of Nursing and Health Sciences
Department of Oral Health
Department of Public Health
Department of Social Sciences

Faculty of Natural Science
Education and research are conducted at the faculty within three departments: 
Department of Computer Science
Department of Food and Meal Science
Department of Environmental Science and Bioscience

Faculty of Education
Education and research is conducted at the faculty within five departments:  
Department of Humanities 
Department of Mathematics and Science Education 
Department of Psychology
Department of Educational Sciences specializing in Pre-School and After School Care, Teaching and Learning
Department of Educational Sciences specializing in Primary and Secondary School, and Special Needs Education

Faculty of Business
Education and research is conducted at the faculty within three departments: 
Department of Business 
Department of Design 
Department of Work science

References

About Kristianstad University

External links
Kristianstad University - Official site

University colleges in Sweden
Kristianstad Municipality
Educational institutions established in 1977
1977 establishments in Sweden